Emil Goršek (3 September 1914 – 1945) was a Yugoslav middle-distance runner. He competed in the men's 800 metres at the 1936 Summer Olympics.

References

1914 births
1945 deaths
Athletes (track and field) at the 1936 Summer Olympics
Yugoslav male middle-distance runners
Olympic athletes of Yugoslavia
Place of birth missing
Sportspeople from Celje